The Showdown Medal is the medal awarded to the player adjudged best on ground in the Showdown AFL match between Adelaide and Port Adelaide. It is thus similar to the Ross Glendinning Medal awarded in Western Derby games. However, no medal is awarded if the teams meet in a final, as they did in 2005.

The Showdown Medal was first presented in Showdown VII, Round 7, 2000. It was formerly known as the "West End Medal", but is currently sponsored by Balfours.

For Showdown 39 in Round 16, 2015, the Showdown Medal was named the Phillip Walsh Medal, after the late Adelaide coach Phil Walsh.

List of Showdown medalists (Men)

List of Showdown medalists (Women)

Retrospective Showdown Medals 
As the Showdown Medal was only introduced in 2000, six Showdowns were played without a medal being awarded. In 2019, Michelangelo Rucci, football writer for The Adelaide Advertiser, advocated for a combination of Brownlow Medal, Club Champion voting, and Media votes to determine the selection for retroactively awarded Showdown Medals. This potential for retrospective Showdown Medals being awarded was enhanced by the Western Derby allocating retrospective medals in 2018. Another Showdown where a medal was not awarded to the player adjudged best afield was the 2005 Semi-Final. The official Adelaide website, afc.com.au, lists Simon Goodwin as their best player in the 2005 Showdown Final with 3 goals and 22 disposals at 91% disposal efficiency to his name.

References

Adelaide Football Club
Port Adelaide Football Club
Australian Football League awards
Awards established in 2000
2000 establishments in Australia